The Schempp-Hirth Ventus-2 is a sailplane produced by Schempp-Hirth since 1994.  It replaced the highly successful Schempp-Hirth Ventus.

Design and development
The Ventus-2a and 2b are 15 metre sailplanes.  The 'a' version has a narrow fuselage and the wider fuselage version is called the 2b. Winglets are used with these models.  The 18 metre span Ventus-2c was introduced in 1995 and was almost an entirely different aircraft with a different fuselage and wings, but it has the option of shorter tips with winglets to fly as a 15-metre sailplane.

From 2003 the Schempp-Hirth Discus-2 fuselage was used for all versions, which now have the designations 2ax, 2bx and 2cx.  Flight tests in 1996 showed that the 15 metre version had a glide angle of 46:1 but only after considerable work on sealing gaps and by using turbulators.

The narrow fuselage Ventus-2a has been highly successful in competitions with consecutive World Championship wins from 1995 to 2003. A narrow fuselage version with an 18-metre span, the Ventus 2cxa has also been built.

Some Ventus-2c and 2cx are fitted with small Solo 2350 sustaining engines (turbos) and are designated with a T suffix, while some are self-launching with a more powerful Solo 2625 and have the suffix 'M'. The 2cT climbs at up to 0.9 m/s (177 ft/min) and the 2cM at over 3 m/s (590 ft/min). The 2cxa has been designed to take a jet engine. A small number of Ventus 2 were fitted with the front electric sustainer.

Production of the 2a and 2b has reached 168 aircraft, while the 2c, 2cT, and 2CM have reached 459.

A replacement model, the Ventus 3, first flew on 29 January 2016 and serial production started in April 2016.

Specifications (Ventus-2cx with 15 metre wings)

See also

References

 Specifications of Schempp-Hirth gliders

Ventus-2
1990s German sailplanes
Aircraft first flown in 1994
Electric aircraft
T-tail aircraft
Motor gliders